Bothrops monsignifer is a species of snake in the family Viperidae. It is native to Peru and Bolivia.

Taxonomy 
The specific epithet for the species is composed of the Latin words for mountain(mons) and fire(igifer), which together mean volcano, in reference to the place where the first specimen in Bolivia was photographed, Refugio Los Volcanes in Santa Cruz.

Distribution and habitat 
The species is found in Cordillera Oriental of the Central Andes from southern Peru to central Bolivia. It is restricted to montane forests with lower humidity and which lack large trees.

References 

monsignifer
Snakes of South America
Reptiles of Bolivia
Reptiles of Peru
Reptiles described in 2019
Taxa named by Juan Carlos Chaparro
Taxa named by Pablo J. Venegas